This article contains information about the literary events and publications of 1539.

Events
April – Printing of the Great Bible (The Byble in Englyshe) is completed; it is distributed to churches in England. Prepared by Myles Coverdale, it contains much material from the Tyndale Bible – unacknowledged as the Tyndale version is officially deemed heretical.
Unknown dates
Game Place House in Great Yarmouth becomes the first place in England to be used regularly as a public theatre.
Marie Dentière writes an open letter to Marguerite of Navarre, sister of King Francis I of France. This Epistre tres utile (very useful letter) calls for an expulsion of Catholic clergy from France.
The first printing press in North America is set up in Mexico City. The first known book from it, Manual de Adultos, appears in 1540.
Teseo Ambrogio's Introductio in Chaldaicam lingua, Syriaca atq Armenica, & dece alias linguas, published in Pavia, introduces several Middle Eastern languages to Western Europe for the first time.

New books

Prose
Robert Estienne – Alphabetum Hebraicum
Martin Luther – On the Councils and the Church

Poetry

Births
February 27 – Franciscus Raphelengius, Flemish-born Dutch scholar, printer and bookseller (died 1597)
March 5 – Christoph Pezel, German theologian (died 1604)
April 12 – Garcilaso de la Vega, Spanish Peruvian mestizo chronicler (died 1616)
December 5 – Fausto Paolo Sozzini, Italian theologian (died 1604)
December 20 – Paulus Melissus, German writer in Latin, translator and composer (died 1602)
Unknown dates
Olivier de Serres, French writer on agriculture and horticulture (died 1619)
Jean de Tournes, French author, printer and bookseller (died 1615)
Richard White of Basingstoke, English jurist and historian (died 1611)

Deaths
March 5 – Kaspar Ursinus Velius, German scholar, poet and historian (born c. 1493)
May 7 – Ottaviano Petrucci, Italian printer (born 1466)
July 5 – Anthony Maria Zaccaria, Italian religious writer, leader of the Counter-reformation and saint (born 1502)
July 12 – Ferdinand Columbus, Spanish bibliographer and cosmographer (born 1488)
August 10 – Lanspergius, German Carthusian monk and ascetic writer (born 1489)
November 25 – Johann Alexander Brassicanus, German author and teacher (born c. 1500)
Unknown date – Gabriel Alonso de Herrera, Spanish author of an agricultural treatise (born 1470)

References

1539

1539 books
 
Renaissance literature
Early Modern literature
Years of the 16th century in literature